The Departmental Council of Gironde is the deliberative assembly of the Gironde department in the region of Nouvelle-Aquitaine. It consists of 66 members (general councilors) from 33 cantons and its headquarters are in Bordeaux.

The President of the General Council is Jean-Luc Gleyze.

Elected officials

President

Vice-Presidents 
The President of the Departmental Council is assisted by 15 vice-presidents chosen from among the departmental advisers. Each of them has a delegation of authority.

See also 

 Gironde
 General councils of France

References 

Gironde
Gironde